Les Discrets is a French post-rock project created and led by Fursy Teyssier as a "platform gathering music and art." Teyssier was the sole member of the band until 2009, when he was joined by Audrey Hadorn and Winterhalter. Les Discrets released Septembre et Ses Dernières Pensées in March 2010, Ariettes oubliées... in February 2012 and, after Winterhalter left the band in 2013, Prédateurs, in April 2017, which saw a transition towards an indie rock and trip hop-oriented sound.

The band considers its name to mean "Those who keep silent", although "The Discreet Ones" would be more an accurate translation.

History
Les Discrets was formed in 2003 as a musical side-project beside Phest, of which Fursy Teyssier was a member, as a way for Fursy, who is also an illustrator, to express concepts similar to those found within his art. Fellow French musicians, Winterhalter and Audrey Hadorn, soon joined the line-up. Les Discrets signed a five-album contract with German record label Prophecy Productions in April, 2009. The band released a split EP with Alcest in December of the same year, and went on to release their first full-length album, Septembre et Ses Dernières Pensées, in March, 2010. According to the German Sonic Seducer magazine, the album features dark, romantic music that cannot be attributed to any single genre. On July 18, 2010, Fursy posted an update on the official site stating that composition for a second album had been completed, and that the studio had already been booked for its recording.

Both Fursy and Winterhalter were members of the now-disbanded Amesoeurs, and Fursy has also been a live member of Alcest until June 2010, for which Winterhalter is a full-time drummer.

In 2013, Teyssier announced that, in a common decision, both Winterhalter and live bassist Neige were leaving the band to focus more on their main band, Alcest.

The band's third studio album, Prédateurs, was released on Bandcamp on April 21, 2017.

In a September 12 2022 Instagram post, Fursy said that the absence of new material was due to his full-time work as a film animator. He said that he was open to doing another album "...when inspiration fully comes back." However, he said that Les Discrets would most likely not perform again due his not enjoying live shows.

Band members

Current
 Fursy Teyssier – lead vocals, guitars, bass (2003–present), keyboards (2011-present)
 Audrey Hadorn – vocals (2009–present), keyboards (2016–present)

Live members
 Jean Joly – drums (2016–present)
 Miguel – guitar (2016–present)
 Brice – bass (2016–present)

Former
 Winterhalter – drums (2009–2013)

Former live
 Neige – bass (2011–2013)
 Zero – guitars, backing vocals (2011–2013)

Timeline

Discography
Studio albums
 Septembre et Ses Dernières Pensées (March 2010)
 Ariettes oubliées... (February 2012)
 Prédateurs (April 2017)

Live albums
 Live at Roadburn (June 2015)

Split releases
 Les Discrets / Alcest with Alcest (November 2009)
 Les Discrets / Arctic Plateau with Arctic Plateau (September 2011)

Extended plays
 Les Discrets (2006)

 Virée Nocturne (August 2016)
 Rue Octavio Mey / Fleur Des Murailles (April 2017)

Compilation appearances
 Whom the Moon a Nightsong Sings (October 2010)

References

External links

French post-rock groups
Shoegazing musical groups
Musical groups established in 2003
Post-metal musical groups
Blackgaze musical groups